There are three 2012 All-Pro Teams—one each named by the Associated Press (AP), Pro Football Writers Association (PFWA), and Sporting News—for performance in the 2012 NFL season. While none of these have the official imprimatur of the NFL (whose official recognition is nomination to the 2013 Pro Bowl), they are included (separately) in the NFL Record and Fact Book. Any player selected to any of the teams can be described as an "All-Pro."

The AP team, with first- and second-team selections, was chosen by a national panel of 50 NFL writers; the Sporting News selection process used a panel of 27 NFL coaches and executives, while the PFWA team is chosen by polling its 300+ members.

Teams

Key
 AP = Associated Press first-team All-Pro
 AP-t = Tied for first-team All-Pro in the AP vote
 AP-2 = Associated Press second-team All-Pro
 AP-2t = Tied for second-team All-Pro in the AP vote
 PFWA = Pro Football Writers Association All-NFL
 SN = Sporting News All-Pro

Position differences
AP = chose no separate punt returner'
AP = chose no separate special teams player
 x-two voters selected only one running back.
 y-one voter did not select a fullback.
 z-one voter selected only one inside linebacker

Notes

References

Sporting News ALl-Pro Team
https://www.pro-football-reference.com/years/2012/allpro.htm

All-Pro Teams
All-Pro Team